1996 in sports describes the year's events in world sport.

Alpine skiing
 Alpine Skiing World Cup
 Men's overall season champion: Lasse Kjus, Norway
 Women's overall season champion: Katja Seizinger, Germany

American football
 Super Bowl XXX – the Dallas Cowboys (NFC) won 27–17 over the Pittsburgh Steelers (AFC)
Location: Sun Devil Stadium
Attendance: 76,347
MVP: Larry Brown, CB (Dallas)
 World Bowl 96 – The Scottish Claymores won 32–27 over the Frankfurt Galaxy.
 Fiesta Bowl (1995 season):
 The Nebraska Cornhuskers won 62–24 over the Florida Gators to win the national championship
 Cleveland Browns deactivate and move to Baltimore where they become the Baltimore Ravens The Browns are later reactivated in Cleveland in 1999.
 The Big 12 Conference begins with its first college football game between Texas Tech and Kansas State.  Kansas State won 21–14.

Association football

Athletics
 July–August – Athletics at the 1996 Summer Olympics held at Atlanta, United States

Australian rules football
 Australian Football League
 North Melbourne wins the 100th AFL premiership (North Melbourne 19.17 (131) d Sydney Swans 13.10 (88))
 Brownlow Medal awarded to James Hird (Essendon) and Michael Voss (Brisbane Bears)
 At the end of the season Fitzroy and the Brisbane Bears merge, forming the Brisbane Lions.

Baseball
 January 8; For the first time in 25 years, no one garners 75 percent of the votes needed to be elected to the Baseball Hall of Fame. Phil Niekro comes closest with 68 percent.
 The New York Yankees won 1996 World Series defeating the Atlanta Braves.

Basketball
 April 1 – NCAA Men's Basketball Championship –
 Kentucky wins 76–67 over Syracuse
 NBA Finals –
 Chicago Bulls win 4 games to 2 over the Seattle SuperSonics, after a record-breaking 72-10 regular season.
 The 1996 NBA Draft takes place at the Continental Airlines Arena in East Rutherford, New Jersey. Tied with the 1984 and 2003 drafts, this draft is considered one of the greatest in NBA history, as it included a class of several Hall of Famers such as Kobe Bryant, Ray Allen, Allen Iverson, and Steve Nash.
 National Basketball League (Australia) Finals:
 South East Melbourne Magic defeated the Melbourne Tigers 2–1 in the best-of-three final series.

Boxing
 March 16 – Christy Martin loses to Deirdre Gogarty by a decision in six rounds to retain her Women's boxing world title in front of a national TV audience. This fight is credited with making the general public aware of women's boxing.
 March 30 to April 7 – 31st European Amateur Boxing Championships held in Vejle, Denmark
 June 7 - Oscar De La Hoya defeats Julio César Chávez by 8th round to win the WBC's world Junior Welterweight championship.

Canadian football
 Grey Cup – Toronto Argonauts win 43–37 over the Edmonton Eskimos
 Vanier Cup – Saskatchewan Huskies win 31–12 over the St. Francis Xavier X-Men
 Ottawa Rough Riders fold

Cricket
 Cricket World Cup – Final: Sri Lanka beat Australia by 7 wickets

Cycling
 Giro d'Italia won by Pavel Tonkov of Russia
 Tour de France – Bjarne Riis of Denmark
 UCI Road World Championships – Men's road race – Johan Museeuw of Belgium

Dogsled racing
 Iditarod Trail Sled Dog Race Champion –
 Jeff King wins with lead dogs: Jake & Booster

Field hockey
 Olympic Games Men's Competition: Netherlands
 Olympic Games Women's Competition: Australia

Figure skating
 World Figure Skating Championships –
 Men's champion: Todd Eldredge, United States
 Ladies' champion: Michelle Kwan, United States
 Pairs' champions: Marina Eltsova / Andrei Bushkov, Russia
 Ice dancing champions: Oksana Grishuk / Evgeny Platov, Russia

Floorball 
 Men's World Floorball Championships
 Champion: Sweden
 European Cup
 Men's champion: Balrog IK
 Women's champion: Högdalens AIS

Gaelic Athletic Association
 Camogie
 All-Ireland Camogie Champion: Galway
 National Camogie League: Cork
 Gaelic football
 All-Ireland Senior Football Championship – Kerry 2-9 died Mayo 1-11
 National Football League – Derry 1-16 died Donegal 1-9
 Ladies' Gaelic football
 All-Ireland Senior Football Champion: Monaghan
 National Football League: Monaghan
 Hurling
 All-Ireland Senior Hurling Championship – Wexford 1-13 died Limerick 0-14
 National Hurling League – Galway 2–10 beat Tipperary 2–8

Golf
Men's professional
 Masters Tournament - Nick Faldo
 U.S. Open - Steve Jones
 British Open - Tom Lehman
 PGA Championship - Mark Brooks
 PGA Tour money leader - Tom Lehman - $1,780,159
 Senior PGA Tour money leader - Jim Colbert - $1,627,890
 Tiger Woods turns professional in September. In the last five regular tournaments of the year on the PGA Tour, his finishes were T5-T3-1-3-1, placing him among the tour's top 30 money-winners for the year and thereby qualifying him for the season-ending The Tour Championship. Woods named the PGA Tour Rookie of the Year.
Men's amateur
 British Amateur - Warren Bladon
 U.S. Amateur - Tiger Woods becomes the first golfer to win three consecutive U.S. Amateur titles. This was the sixth consecutive year in which he won a USGA championship, one short of Bobby Jones' record of seven.
 European Amateur - Daniel Olsson
Women's professional
 Nabisco Dinah Shore - Patty Sheehan
 LPGA Championship - Laura Davies
 U.S. Women's Open - Annika Sörenstam
 Classique du Maurier - Laura Davies
 LPGA Tour money leader - Karrie Webb - $1,002,000 - becomes the first ever woman to earn more than a million dollars in one golf season.
 The United States team retained the Solheim Cup beating the European team 17 to 11.

Handball
 Men's European Championship: Russia
 Women's European Championship: Denmark

Harness racing
 June 22 - the fastest race mile in harness racing history was set by Jenna's Beach Boy (1:47.3) at Meadowlands Racetrack
 North America Cup - Arizona Jack
 United States Pacing Triple Crown races –
 Cane Pace - Scoot To Power
 Little Brown Jug -  Armbro Operative
 Messenger Stakes - Go For Grins
 United States Trotting Triple Crown races –
 Hambletonian - Continentalvictory
 Yonkers Trot - Continentalvictory
 Kentucky Futurity - Running Sea
 Australian Inter Dominion Harness Racing Championship –
 Pacers: Young Mister Charles
 Trotters: Pride Of Petite

Horse racing
 Inaugural running of the Dubai World Cup, promoted as the "world's richest horse race", at the Nad Al Sheba Racecourse in Dubai.
Steeplechases
 Cheltenham Gold Cup – Imperial Call
 Grand National – Rough Quest
Flat races
 Australia – Melbourne Cup won by Saintly
 Canada – Queen's Plate won by Victor Cooley
 Dubai – Dubai World Cup won by Cigar	
 France – Prix de l'Arc de Triomphe won by Helissio
 Ireland – Irish Derby Stakes won by Zagreb
 Japan – Japan Cup won by Singspiel
 English Triple Crown races:
 2,000 Guineas Stakes – Mark of Esteem
 The Derby – Shaamit
 St. Leger Stakes – Shantou
 United States Triple Crown races:
 Kentucky Derby – Grindstone
 Preakness Stakes – Louis Quatorze
 Belmont Stakes – Editor's Note
 Breeders' Cup World Thoroughbred Championships:
 Breeders' Cup Classic – Alphabet Soup
 Breeders' Cup Distaff – Jewel Princess
 Breeders' Cup Juvenile – Boston Harbor
 Breeders' Cup Juvenile Fillies – Storm Song
 Breeders' Cup Mile – Da Hoss
 Breeders' Cup Sprint – Lit de Justice
 Breeders' Cup Turf – Pilsudski

Ice hockey
 Art Ross Trophy as the NHL's leading scorer during the regular season: Mario Lemieux, Pittsburgh Penguins
 Hart Memorial Trophy – for the NHL's Most Valuable Player: Mario Lemieux, Pittsburgh Penguins
 Stanley Cup - the Colorado Avalanche defeat the Florida Panthers 4 games to 0 for their first-ever Stanley Cup title.  It was also the franchise's first season since relocating from Quebec City, where they were known as the Nordiques.
 World Cup of Hockey
 Champion: United States defeated Canada
 World Hockey Championship
 Men's champion: Czech Republic defeated Canada
 Junior Men's champion: Canada defeated Sweden
 Phoenix Coyotes (now Arizona Coyotes) play inaugural season.

Lacrosse
 The Buffalo Bandits defeat the Philadelphia Wings 13–12 to win the Major Indoor Lacrosse League championship

Mixed martial arts
The following is a list of major noteworthy MMA events during 1996 in chronological order.

Before 1997, the Ultimate Fighting Championship (UFC) was considered the only major MMA organization in the world and featured much fewer rules then are used in modern MMA.

Motorsport

Professional Wrestling
 July 7: For the first time in 15 years, Hulk Hogan becomes a villain, and forms the New World Order alongside Scott Hall and Kevin Nash.

Radiosport
 The second World Radiosport Team Championship held in San Francisco, California, US  Gold medals go to Jeff Steinman KRØY and Dan Street K1TO of the United States.

Rugby league
 January: England - The 1995–96 Rugby Football League season ends with Wigan declared champions.
 March 29: Paris – the new Super League competition, the first ever season of professional rugby to be played in summer, begins with new team Paris Saint-Germain's first match: a 30–24 win over Sheffield Eagles at Charlety Stadium before 17,873.
April 27: London, England - The 1996 Challenge Cup tournament culminates in St Helens' 40–32 victory over Bradford Bulls in the final at Wembley Stadium before a crowd of 75,994.
June 3: Sydney, Australia - The 1996 State of Origin series is wrapped up as New South Wales defeat Queensland 18–6 in Game II at the Sydney Football Stadium before a crowd of 41,955.
June 26: Cardiff, Wales - The 1996 European Rugby League Championship is won by England who defeated Wales 26–12 at Cardiff Arms Park before a crowd of 5,245
 August 31: Salford, England - The 1996 Student Rugby League World Cup culminates in Australia's 28 - 16 defeat of Samoa
 September 29: Sydney, Australia - The 1996 ARL season culminates the Manly-Warringah Sea Eagles' 20–8 grand final victory over the St. George Dragons at the Sydney Football Stadium before a crowd of 40,985
The 1996 Queensland Cup Season is won by the Toowoomba Clydesdales
Super League I ends with St. Helens being crowned champions for finishing on top of the League
The Great Britain national team go on a their tour of the Papua New Guinea, Fiji and New Zealand.

Rugby union
 102nd Five Nations Championship series is won by England
 SANZAR's new leagues the Super 12 (now Super 14) and the Tri Nations Series begin. The Super 12 is won by the Auckland Blues and the Tri Nations is won by the New Zealand All Blacks

Snooker
 World Snooker Championship – Stephen Hendry beats Peter Ebdon 18-12
 World rankings – Stephen Hendry remains world number one for 1996-97

Swimming
 XXVI Olympic Games, held in Atlanta United States (July 20 – July 26)
 First European SC Championships, held in Riesa, Germany (December 13 – 15)
 Germany wins the most medals (39) and the most gold medals (14)
 December 1 – American swimmer Misty Hyman clocks 58:29 to break the world record in the women's 100m butterfly (short course)

Tennis
 Grand Slam in tennis men's results:
 Australian Open - Boris Becker
 French Open - Yevgeny Kafelnikov
 Wimbledon championships - Richard Krajicek
 U.S. Open - Pete Sampras
 Grand Slam in tennis women's results:
 Australian Open - Monica Seles
 French Open - Steffi Graf
 Wimbledon championships - Steffi Graf
 U.S. Open - Steffi Graf
 1996 Summer Olympics
 Men's Singles Competition – Andre Agassi
 Women's Singles Competition – Lindsay Davenport
 Men's Doubles Competition – Todd Woodbridge & Mark Woodforde
 Women's Doubles Competition – Gigi Fernández & Mary Joe Fernández
 Davis Cup final:
 France wins 3–2 over Sweden
 Fed Cup final:
 USA wins 5–0 over Spain

Volleyball
 Men's World League: Netherlands
 Women's World Grand Prix: Brazil
 Olympic Games Men's Competition: Netherlands
 Olympic Games Women's Competition: Cuba

Water polo
 Olympic Games Men's Competition: Spain
 Olympic Games Women's Competition: Netherlands

Multi-sport events
 1996 Summer Olympics takes place in Atlanta, United States
 United States wins the most medals (101), and the most gold medals (44).
 Winter Asian Games held in Harbin, China
 Athletic competition in the Big 12 Conference is inaugurated with a football game between Kansas State University and Texas Tech University, in Manhattan, Kansas on August 31.

Awards
 Associated Press Male Athlete of the Year – Michael Johnson, Track and field
 Associated Press Female Athlete of the Year – Amy Van Dyken, Swimming

References

 
Sports by year